Majili is a 2019 Indian Telugu-language romantic sports drama film directed by Shiva Nirvana and produced by Sahu Garapati and Harish Peddi under the banner of Shine Screens Production. The film stars Samantha Ruth Prabhu, Naga Chaitanya and Divyansha Kaushik, with Subbaraju, Rao Ramesh, and Atul Kulkarni in supporting roles.

The film marks Chaitanya and Samantha's fourth collaboration after Ye Maaya Chesave, Manam, and Autonagar Surya. 

It released on 5 April 2019 to generally positive reviews from both the audience and critics, alike. The film was remade in Marathi as Ved in 2022.

Plot 
Poorna Chandar Rao, who lives in Vizag with his father Rama Chandar Rao, aspires to play for the Indian Cricket Team and wants to initially get selected for the local railway team. While trying to get money to get into a cricket team, he runs into Anshu, and after some misunderstandings, they become close and fall in love. However, they are later separated by Anshu's parents and the circumstances that plague them: Anshu, who promises to return to Poorna, never comes back. Poorna falls into a depressed state, turning to alcohol for his pain and pushing away his cricket career.

Meanwhile, Sravani, Poorna's neighbour, had been in love with Poorna, which he is unaware of. When she had learned of Poorna's love for Anshu, she had been distancing herself from him, but she marries him after a few years after seeing his and his father's pain. Poorna marries Sravani due to pressure from his father, but maintains his distance and does not go to work, instead reliving his memories with Anshu and relying on Sravani's salary for money to buy alcohol, who works for the Indian Railways at Simhachalam Railway Station.

When Poorna goes to Dehradun to help select some cricket players for the youth team, he encounters Meera, Anshu's daughter. He learns from Anshu's father that Anshu and her husband Kunal died in an accident and agrees to take Meera back with him to Vizag for cricket training, at Anshu's father, Rajeev's request. Meera while training with Poorna, learns the truth about her mother and Poorna, insists that she would play only as a representative of the local Railway team, which needs at least one of her parent as an employee of Railways. So, Poorna and Sravani decide to adopt Meera so that she can participate in the local railway team and follow her passion for cricket. However, Meera says that she will only agree if Poorna and Sravani act like a husband and wife and not strangers, which they agree to.

During this time, Poorna realizes Sravani's love for him, and  he decides to leave his past for a new start. However, Sravani thinks that he is just acting his love for her. So, she decides to get a job transfer to Bhubaneswar, leaving Poorna behind. When Poorna goes to drop Sravani off at the railway station, he tells that he loves her. He was actually going to tell her that he loves her, but she then has decided to leave. Sravani decides to stay, and they embrace, finishing Poorna's journey (Majili) towards love.

Cast 

 Naga Chaitanya Akkineni as Poorna Chandra Rao
 Samantha Ruth Prabhu as Sravani, Poorna Chandra Rao's wife 
 Divyansha Kaushik as Anshu, Poorna Chandra Rao's love interest 
 Subbaraju as Bhushan
 Rao Ramesh as Rama Chandra Rao, Poorna's father 
 Atul Kulkarni as Navy Officer Rajeev, Anshu's father
 Ananya Agarwal as Meera, Anshu and Kunal's daughter (later adopted daughter of Sravani and Poorna)
 Posani Krishna Murali as Rajendra, Sravani's father
 Sai Teja Kalvakota as Kunal, Anshu's husband
 Rajshri Nair as Sri Lakshmi, Sravani's mother
 Ravi Prakash as Coach Srinu
 Suhas as Jonty, Poorna's friend
 C. V. L. Narasimha Rao as Subramanyam, Sravani's manager
 Rajitha as Anshu's mother

Production 
The second schedule was shot in Vizag, at the Simhachalam railway station, where Samantha was seen as a booking clerk.

The movie was wrapped up on 21 February 2019. Dubbing work and post-production was completed on 16 March 2019.

Soundtrack  

The music is composed by Gopi Sundar, and the background score is by S. Thaman released on Aditya Music label.

First track from the album, "One Boy One Girl", was released on 8 March 2019. Second track "Priyathama Priyathama" sung by Chinmayi Sripada and lyrics penned by Chaitanyaprasad was released on 11 March 2019. Third track "Naa Gundello" sung by Yazin Nizar  and Nikhita Gandhi and lyrics penned by Rambabu Gosala was released on 14 March 2019. Fourth track Yedetthu Mallele sung by Kaala Bhairava and Nikhita Gandhi and lyrics penned by Shiva Nirvana was released on 18 March 2019. Fifth track, Ye Manishike Majiliyo, sung by Arun Gopan, Chinmayi Sripada, and Baby Anusha and lyrics penned by Vanamali was released on 21 March 2019.

The Times of India singled out the song Priyathama Priyathama for praise.

Release 
The movie was released on 5 April 2019 as Ugadi Special. Moonshine Cinemas, an Overseas distribution company is released movie in USA, Premieres on 4 April.

Marketing 
The first look of Naga Chaitanya was revealed on his birthday. The look featured the actor in a beard, sitting on an old-model scooter.
The first look of the film released on 30 December 2018, one day before new year which features Naga Chaitanya with a beard look and Samantha holding each other. The second look of the film was released on the eve of Makar Sankranti 14 January 2019, which features Chaitanya as cricketer with clean shave look and Divyansha Kaushik by his side. A new poster was released on 12 February 2019, in which Naga Chaitanya and Samantha were seen happy on boarding bus, and the team has announced the teaser date.
Teaser of the movie was released on 14 February 2019 as a Valentine's Day treat.

Team has announced a contest my releasing a new poster as 'My Majili Poster' on 1 March 2019, in which Samantha looking at Chaitanya happily which look so adorable, and a cricket kit bag beside Chaitanya. A new poster was released  on 3 March 2019 in which Naga Chaitanya and Samantha are seen on bike, in which Samantha looks happy seeing Chaitanya.

A pre-release event was held on 31 March 2019, to which Venkatesh and Nagarjuna attended as chief guests. And movie trailer was also released in the same event.

Reception

Box office 
Majili collected a total gross of 28.15 crores and share of 17.35 Crores in the first weekend, and became biggest opener in Naga Chaitanya's career.
In just five days, the movie collected a total gross of 40 Crores and share of 21.50 Crores worldwide, and recovered 100 percent of its distributors' investments.

In the first week, it collected a total gross of 45.60 Crores and share of 27.85 Crores worldwide.

In 10 days, it collected a total share of 32.93 Crores worldwide. 

In 28 days, it collected a total gross of 68.05 Crores and a share of 38.52 Crores worldwide. Movie collected 40 Crores share and 70 Crores gross worldwide in 30 days.

It collected 140,454 through premiers in United States.

Critical reception 
NDTV gave 3.5 out of 5 stars stating "Seamless in its emotional velocity, Majili neatly weaves together the fluctuating fortunes of three messy lives. There is nothing here that we haven't seen before. But then, who said life is all about constantly finding new experiences? Exploring the inner spaces of the man-woman mythology, Majili hits on a narrative that's moving and rewarding".
Firstpost gave 3.5 out of 5 stars stating "Majili is an honest portrayal of relationships. With some terrific performances by its cast, Vishnu Sarma’s cinematography, and fine writing from Shiva Niravana, the film turns into an enriching experience. It does leave you with a hangover of pain and love. Two big thumbs up".
News18 gave 3.5 out of 5 stars stating "The film about losing love and finding faith, is a lengthy and fairly satisfying ode to the human heart and its vagaries."
The Times of India gave 3 out of 5 stars stating "Majili takes you on a gripping rollercoaster ride, but it's a romance drama with more pain than love".
IndiaGlitz gave 3 out of 5 stars stating " 'Majili' is about events rather than conversations.  It could have been a coming-of-age drama but it remains content with situational humour and convenient situations for the most part.  Performances and a couple of other elements save the day".

Home media 
Gemini TV acquired the satellite rights for ₹5 crore, digital streaming rights were acquired by Amazon Prime video for ₹3.5 crore and Hindi dubbing rights were sold to Aditya Movies for ₹4 crore.
The film is available for streaming on Amazon Prime video since 10 May 2019. The Hindi dubbed version was premiered on Sony Max on 7 February 2020.

Accolades

Notes

References

External links 
 

2019 films
Films scored by Gopi Sundar
2010s Telugu-language films
2019 romantic drama films
Indian sports drama films
Films about cricket in India
Indian romantic drama films
2010s sports drama films
Films directed by Shiva Nirvana
Telugu films remade in other languages